A water table is a projection of lower masonry on the outside of a wall slightly above the ground.

It is both a functional and architectural feature that consists of a projection that deflects water running down the face of a building away from lower courses or the foundation. A water table may also  be primarily decorative, as found near the base of a wall or at a transition between materials, such as from stone to brick. The top of the water table is often sloped or chamfered to throw off water.

Often a damp
course is placed at the level of the water table to prevent upward penetration of ground water.

References

Bibliography

External links 
 Definition with a photograph
 Manufacturer's web page that includes a definition

Architectural elements
Architectural design
Drainage